Goniurosaurus liboensis is a species of geckos endemic to China.

References

Goniurosaurus
Reptiles of China
Reptiles described in 2013